Leggett is an unincorporated community in Polk County, Texas, United States. It is located at the junction of U.S. Highway 59 (Future Interstate 69) and Farm to Market Road 942. As of 2000, the community had approximately 500 residents.

The Leggett Independent School District serves area students.

History
In 1919 Leggett, described as a "sundown town", a white council set a curfew for blacks, banned black fraternal and church meetings, and forbade African Americans from visiting the railroad station or the Post Office.

Climate
The climate in this area is characterized by hot, humid summers and generally mild to cool winters.  According to the Köppen Climate Classification system, Leggett has a humid subtropical climate, abbreviated "Cfa" on climate maps.

References

Unincorporated communities in Polk County, Texas
Unincorporated communities in Texas
Sundown towns in Texas